Nondescripts Cricket Club Ground, a first-class cricket ground in Maitland Place, Colombo, is the home ground of the Nondescripts Cricket Club.

Location
The ground is in the Cinnamon Gardens district of Colombo, next to the Sinhalese Sports Club Ground and across Maitland Place from the Colombo Cricket Club Ground.

History
Nondescripts Cricket Club, founded in 1888, moved to the ground in 1910 after reclaiming it from swampland. It first hosted first-class cricket in 1926, and has been in constant use as a first-class venue since 1989. Three One Day International matches were played there in 1986–87, and three Women's One Day Internationals in 2010–11. A new pavilion was opened in 2007.

As of early December 2021, 223 first-class matches and 155 List A matches had been played at the ground.

Records
The highest first-class score on the ground is 290 not out by Lahiru Udara for Nondescripts against Ragama in 2019–20. The best bowling figures are 8 for 24 by Nimesh Perera for Sebastianites against Nondescripts in 2000–01.

References

External links
Nondescripts Cricket Club Ground at Cricinfo
Nondescripts Cricket Club Ground at CricketArchive

Cricket grounds in Colombo
Sport in Colombo